Marian Jurečka (born 15 March 1981) is a Czech politician, serving as Deputy Prime Minister and Minister of Labour and Social Affairs since 17 December 2021 and who served as Minister of the Environment from November 2022 to March 2023 both in Petr Fiala's Cabinet. He was previously appointed as the Minister of Agriculture in the government of Bohuslav Sobotka from 2014 to 2017. 

He has been the chairman of the Christian and Democratic Union – Czechoslovak People's Party (KDU-ČSL) since 25 January 2020, and a deputy in the Chamber of Deputies since 2013.

References 

1981 births
KDU-ČSL MPs
Agriculture ministers of the Czech Republic
Living people
Mendel University Brno alumni
KDU-ČSL Government ministers
People from Přerov
Members of the Chamber of Deputies of the Czech Republic (2017–2021)
Members of the Chamber of Deputies of the Czech Republic (2013–2017)
Members of the Chamber of Deputies of the Czech Republic (2021–2025)
Labour and Social Affairs ministers of the Czech Republic
Environment ministers of the Czech Republic